George Huntley may refer to:

George Huntley (MP) (c. 1512–1580), member of parliament for Cricklade
George Huntley (musician), American singer, guitarist, and songwriter
G. P. Huntley, stage actor
G. P. Huntley Jr., film actor